Chad's Gap is a  backcountry gap located in the Wasatch Mountains, approximately  northeast of Alta Ski Area, in northern Utah, United States. One version of the structure's discovery has it that Chad Zurinskas, a local Utah resident after whom the gap was purportedly named, discovered it as a gap between two piles of mine tailings in 1999 and arranged with filmmaker Kris Ostness to make the first successful jump. The first successful jump was done by Candide Thovex. Tanner Hall aka 'Ski Boss' blew both his ankles to pieces by coming up short on the gap. He recalled it to feel like someone had loaded his ski boots with dynamite. His quote "my ankles are broken, my ankles are broke" has become famous in the snow sports world.

References

External links
 
 

Mountain passes of Utah
Snowboarding
Skiing in the United States
Wasatch Range
Ski jumping in the United States
Skiing in Utah